Thomas Nelson House is an historic Colonial home in Yorktown, Virginia.  It was built around 1730 and held by generations of the Nelson family through the Revolutionary War. After years in private ownership, it was designated as a National Historic Landmark and added to the National Register of Historic Places in 1966.  

It was acquired by the National Park Service in 1968 and restored in 1976 to its 18th-century character. It is also a contributing property to Colonial National Historical Park in Yorktown and among the battlefield attractions.

History

The house was built by Thomas "Scotch Tom" Nelson around 1730, and later occupied by his grandson, Founding Father Thomas Nelson, Jr. (1738-1789) during the American Revolutionary War. Nelson, Jr., who signed the Declaration of Independence as a delegate to the Second Continental Congress, was a planter, politician, and later governor of Virginia.

The house was damaged during the siege of Yorktown. It served as a hospital during the Civil War. 

In 1914, it was purchased by Captain and Mrs. George P. Blow, who renamed it as "York Hall". They made a number of additions to update the property, which were designed by Griffin & Wynkoop. 

In 1968, the National Park Service bought the property. It restored the house in 1976 to its 18th-century character. It has been designated as the Thomas Nelson House, a National Historical Landmark. It is also a contributing property to the Yorktown Battlefield Part of Colonial National Historical Park. It is open for tours as part of the Yorktown Battlefield attractions.

References

External links

Nelson House - Yorktown Battlefield
Waymarking.com
Rememberyorktown.org

Historic district contributing properties in Virginia
Nelson family of Virginia
Houses completed in 1730
Houses in York County, Virginia
Georgian architecture in Virginia
Colonial architecture in Virginia
American Civil War sites
Museums in York County, Virginia
Historic house museums in Virginia
National Register of Historic Places in York County, Virginia
Homes of United States Founding Fathers